Dirotus is a genus of beetles in the family Carabidae, containing the following species:

 Dirotus extensicollis (Bates, 1892)
 Dirotus feae (Bates, 1889)
 Dirotus reflexus Andrewes, 1929
 Dirotus sikkimensis Jedlicka, 1955
 Dirotus subiridescens (W.S. MacLeay, 1825)

References

Platyninae